Carex nigra is a perennial species of plants in the family Cyperaceae native to wetlands of Europe, western Asia, north Africa, and eastern North America. Common names include common sedge, black sedge or smooth black sedge. The eastern limit of its range reaches central Siberia, Turkey and probably the Caucasus.

References

nigra
Plants described in 1753
Taxa named by Carl Linnaeus